Similosodus fuscosignatus is a species of beetle in the family Cerambycidae. It was described by Stephan von Breuning in 1939, originally under the genus Sodus. It is known from Java, Borneo, and Malaysia.

References

fuscosignatus
Beetles described in 1939